Mahmut Cuhruk (1925 – 8 October 2018) was a Turkish judge. He was president of the Constitutional Court of Turkey from 2 March 1988 until 1 March 1990.

Cuhruk was born in Yozgat in 1925. He died in Ankara on 8 October 2018.

References

External links
Web-site of the Constitutional Court of Turkey 

1925 births
2018 deaths
Turkish judges
Turkish civil servants
Presidents of the Constitutional Court of Turkey